Institute of Oceanography may refer to:

Bedford Institute of Oceanography
Florida Institute of Oceanography
Skidaway Institute of Oceanography

See also
Oceanographic Institute (disambiguation)
National Institute of Oceanography (disambiguation)